Gabriel M. Rebeiz is a Lebanese-American electrical and computer engineer, currently the Wireless Communications Industry Chair Chair and Professor at University of California, San Diego. He is the first to introduce MEMS and micromachining to the RF/microwave field by developing several novel components with this technology. He is also the pioneer of the integrated phased arrays for communication and defense systems. He was elected a member of the National Academy of Engineering (NAE) in 2016 for contributions to radio frequency microelectromechanical systems (RF MEMS) and phased array technologies. He is also a Fellow of the Institute of Electrical and Electronics Engineers.

References

Year of birth missing (living people)
Living people
Rice University faculty
American electrical engineers